The Shire of Ravensthorpe is a local government area in the southern Goldfields-Esperance region of Western Australia, about halfway between the city of Albany and the town of Esperance and about  southeast of the state capital, Perth.

History
The Phillips River Road District was gazetted on 9 November 1900. On 1 July 1961, it became the Shire of Ravensthorpe under the Local Government Act 1960, which reformed all remaining road districts into shires.

Wards
As of the 2003 election, the Shire is divided into three wards:

 Ravensthorpe Ward (two councillors)
 Hopetoun Ward (two councillors)
 Rural Ward (three councillors)

Towns and localities
The towns and localities of the Shire of Ravensthorpe with population and size figures based on the most recent Australian census:

(* indicates locality is only partially located within this shire)

Heritage-listed places

As of 2023, 122 places are heritage-listed in the Shire of Ravensthorpe, of which one is on the State Register of Heritage Places, the Metropolitan Hotel in Hopetoun.

Sex Scandal
In September 2021, Shire of Ravensthorpe chief executive Gavin Pollock was sacked after being accused of spending almost $55,000 of shire money on a sex worker. A report tabled in the Western Australian State Parliament on 22 September 2021 alleges that Mr Pollock was a client of a sex worker named "Ms E", for whom he issued multiple fake invoices and purchase orders on his office computer totalling $54,850. Two further invoices totalling a combined $13,350 were prepared but not paid as a result of the commission investigation.

References

External links
 

Ravensthorpe